Protein Mdm4 is a protein that in humans is encoded by the MDM4 gene.

Function 

The human MDM4 gene, which plays a role in apoptosis, encodes a 490-amino acid protein containing a RING finger domain and a putative nuclear localization signal. The MDM4 putative nuclear localization signal, which all Mdm proteins contain, is located in the C-terminal region of the protein. The mRNA is expressed at a high level in thymus and at lower levels in all other tissues tested. MDM4 protein produced by in vitro translation interacts with p53 via a binding domain located in the N-terminal region of the MDM4 protein. MDM4 shows significant structural similarity to p53-binding protein MDM2

Interactions 

MDM4 has been shown to interact with E2F1, Mdm2 and P53.

References

Further reading